Mirosław Szymkowiak (born 12 November 1976) is a Polish former professional footballer who played as an attacking midfielder. Szymkowiak is also a former member of the Poland national team.

Career
Born in Poznań, Poland, Szymkowiak first started playing at Olimpia Poznań, where he played from 1992 until 1994, when he joined Widzew Łódź. He remained there for five and a half years, when he left to join Wisła Kraków in the middle of the 2000–01 season. He helped them to win the championship in his first season, and to two further championships in 2003 and 2004. In January 2005, he joined the Turkish club Trabzonspor. In his first six months at Trabzonspor he scored nine goals in fifteen starts.

As well as playing for Trabzonspor, Szymkowiak appeared 31 times and scored three goals for Poland. He was selected to the 23-men squad that competed at the 2006 FIFA World Cup finals in Germany.

Retirement
In December 2007, he announced his retirement from football. Szymkowiak finished his career due to health reasons. In an interview for a Polish website he said: "I'm just turning 31, and already I've gone through eight surgeries! I've got four screws in both my knees, one in my ankle. They [doctors, red.] removed one I had in the shoulder, but I also have two titanium nets in my groins. I feel older than my dad, and in a couple of years time I'd like to walk like a normal person." Later, in an interview for Polish newspaper Super Express, he stated that his retirement was mainly attributed to his drug use: he used rofecoxib for his pain problems, which was related to his injuries, but it was found to cause serious blood and bone marrow problems, resulting in lowering his performance and stamina.

Post-playing career
Szymkowiak works as a pitch reporter for Canal+ Poland. His debut as a reporter was an Ekstraklasa game between GKS Bełchatów and Zagłębie Lubin on 5 April 2007. He also owns two beauty salons in Kraków.

References

External links
 

Living people
1976 births
Footballers from Poznań
Polish footballers
Association football midfielders
Poland international footballers
2006 FIFA World Cup players
Olimpia Poznań players
Widzew Łódź players
Wisła Kraków players
Trabzonspor footballers
Ekstraklasa players
Süper Lig players
Polish expatriate footballers
Polish expatriate sportspeople in Turkey
Expatriate footballers in Turkey